Ronggo was an administrative title used by the Dutch in the Dutch East Indies in Indonesia (specifically Java and Borneo.)

Ronggo of "Afdeeling" Bandjarmasin was held by Kiahi Mas Djaja Samoedra (circa 1899) (EYD or "advanced spelling": Kiai Mas Jaya Samudera). The region saw much international trade with Asia and the Middle East. After a period of warfare dominated much of the late 1500s to mid 1600s, Portugal controlled the area for a short time.

Following Portuguese control, the Dutch East India Company awarded a monopoly on trade and colonization in the area utilizing an exceptional financial backing, better organization, strategy, weapons and ships, but were still unable to completely dominate the Indonesian spice trade. In the 1800s, the Dutch East India Company dissolved due to bankruptcy and the Netherlands turned it into a nationalized colony.

Bandjarmasi leadership structure:

Assistant Resident: E.B. Masthoff
Police chief: C.W.H. Born
Ronggo: Kiahi Mas Djaja Samoedra
Chinese Lieutenants: Sin Yoe and Ang Lim Thay
Captain of Arabs: Hasan bin Said Al Habesi Idroes

Rank history

Regent (abolished in 1884)
Temonggong
Ronggo (abolished 1905)
Kiai and Demang

References
http://european-heritage.org/netherlands/alkmaar/dutch-east-india-company

http://www.abbreviations.com/EYD

http://www.worldatlas.com/webimage/countrys/asia/id2.htm#page

Political titles
Dutch East Indies